Chatzenstrick Pass (el. 1053 m.) is a mountain pass in the Alps in the canton of Schwyz in Switzerland.

It connects Einsiedeln and Altmatt and was a route of pilgrimage to the abbey at Einsiedeln.

See also
List of the highest Swiss passes

Mountain passes of Switzerland
Mountain passes of the canton of Schwyz